A referendum on the legality of alcoholic beverages was held in Ontario, Canada on December 4, 1902. Though 65 percent of voters indicated support for prohibition, a majority of half of the number of voters in the 1898 election did not support the motion, and prohibition was not introduced.

Referendum question 
Are you in favour of bringing into force Part II of The Liquor Act, 1902? 

The Judicial Committee of the Privy Council had previously ruled in 1896 that provinces do not have the authority to prohibit the importation of alcohol. Part II of the Liquor Act would authorize prohibition to the extent that Ontario would be allowed to enact, specifically a ban on the sale of alcohol in bars and retail establishments and the placement of restrictions on the sale of alcohol in restaurants.

Results 

Part II of the Liquor Act required (1) a majority of votes in the referendum and (2) more than half of the number of votes in the 1898 election to pass the legislation; the second requirement was not met. The turnout rate was estimated to be no more than 30 percent of the electorate, and prohibition was not adopted.

See also
 Prohibition in Canada
 Canada Temperance Act
 1894 Ontario prohibition plebiscite
 1919 Ontario prohibition referendum
 1921 Ontario prohibition referendum
 1924 Ontario prohibition referendum

References

Bibliography

1902 in Ontario
1902 referendums
1902 elections in Canada
Ontario prohibition referendums
December 1902 events